Jonathan Mark Butterworth is a Professor of Physics at University College London (UCL) working on the ATLAS experiment at CERN's Large Hadron Collider (LHC). His popular science book Smashing Physics, which tells the story of the search for the Higgs boson, was published in 2014 and his newspaper column / blog Life and Physics is published by The Guardian.

Early life and education
Butterworth was raised in Manchester and educated at Wright Robinson High School in Gorton and Shena Simon Sixth Form College. He studied Physics at the University of Oxford, gaining a Bachelor of Arts degree in 1989 followed by a Doctor of Philosophy in particle physics in 1992. His PhD research used the ZEUS particle detector to investigate R-parity violating supersymmetry at the Hadron-Electron Ring Accelerator (HERA) at the Deutsches Elektronen-Synchrotron (DESY) in Hamburg, and was supervised by  Doug Gingrich and Herbert K. Dreiner.

Research and career
 Butterworth works on particle physics, particularly the ATLAS experiment at the Large Hadron Collider at CERN. His research investigates what nature is like at the smallest distances and the highest energies - the fundamental physical laws. This tells us about the physics which was most important in the first few moments after the Big Bang. His research collaborators include Brian Cox and Jeff Forshaw and he has supervised or co-supervised several successful PhD students to completion on the ATLAS experiment, ZEUS and HERA.

Butterworth frequently discusses physics in public, including talks at the Royal Institution and the Wellcome Trust and appearances on Newsnight, Horizon, Channel 4 News, Al Jazeera, and BBC Radio 4's Today Programme and The Infinite Monkey Cage. 
He appeared with Gavin Salam in the Science and Technology Facilities Council (STFC) documentary Colliding Particles - Hunting the Higgs, which follows a team of physicists trying to find the Higgs Boson.

His research has been funded by the Science and Technology Facilities Council (STFC) and the Royal Society.

Bibliography 

 Smashing Physics (2014)
 A Map of the Invisible (2017)

Awards and honours
Butterworth was awarded a prestigious Royal Society Wolfson Research Merit Award in 2009 and shortlisted for the Royal Society Winton Prize for Science Books in 2015 for his book Smashing Physics. He was awarded the James Chadwick Medal and Prize by the Institute of Physics (IOP) in 2013. His citation at the IOP reads:

Smashing Physics was also shortlisted for Book of the Year by Physics World in 2014.

References

People associated with CERN
Royal Society Wolfson Research Merit Award holders
Academics of University College London
Alumni of the University of Oxford
Living people
British physicists
Year of birth missing (living people)